

Description 
Class Z23500 also called TER 2N (TER 2 Niveaux) is double deck a class of railway electric multiple units operated in France. They were built by GEC-Alstom and Ateliers du Nord de la France, (which became Bombardier) for SNCF and are used on the TER Network. These sets consist of 2 double deck coaches. They were built from 1997 and a total of 80 units were built. The units were ordered by the following regions: Provence-Alpes-Côte d'Azur, Nord-Pas-de-Calais and Rhône-Alpes. They are mainly used on stopping services around the French Riviera (Provence-Alpes-Côte d'Azur), Lille (Nord-Pas-de-Calais) and Lyon (Rhône-Alpes).They are all in the TER livery, which is a Blue Front in a diagonal line with a metallic grey side. However the Rhône-Alpes units have green and purple sides with Rhône-Alpes written on the side in Large writing.

History 
During the 80's, Nord-Pas-de-Calais noticed massive growth of regional frequentation. The region ordered a first set of 6 Class Z 92050 in 1994 technicly identical to Class Z 20500 to cope this situation. The Class Z 92050 offer a better power performances in comparison of tracted VO 2N and a satisfaying capacity. Rhône-Alpes and PACA was also interested about the Z 2N series due to the growth of frequentation but wanted better amenagements for long distances. The Z 23500 serie is the first generation of TER  2N séries followed in 2004 by the Z 24500/ Z 26500 series also called TER 2N NG.

Following a tender Nord-Pas-de-Calais, Rhône-Alpes and PACA ordered 80 Z 23500 trainset (160 cars) to GEC-Alsthom and ANF in 1995.

SNCF completed a refurbishment programme on all of its Z 23500 sets in September 2022.

Design 
The Class Z 23500 is based on a half 4 cars Z 20500 train with engine and amenagements upgrades. The Z 2N platform was used due to the capacity, and upgrades was introduced like beter seats and IGBT based traction system. Air conditioning was also added to improve comfort.

The original project was designed with a GTO component based traction system but GEC-Alsthom proposed a new traction system based on IGBT component witch is called ONIX.

The traction system is based on IGBT components and 3-phase asynchronous motors. The ONIX traction system was tested on a Z 20500 (194 A) train between 1996 and 1997, this train was nicknamed "ADONIX" for «Automotrice Deux niveaux ONIX». This traction system is also use in Class Z 20900 and CP Class CP 3500.

Delivery 

The first three pre-series trains ( Z 23501, Z 23502 and Z 23503) was delivered in automn 1997 for testing. The first series train ( Z 23505) entered in service in February the 15th 1998.

References 

Z 23500
Double-decker EMUs
Electric multiple units of France
Alstom multiple units
Bombardier Transportation multiple units
Train-related introductions in 1997
25 kV AC multiple units
1500 V DC multiple units of France